|}

The Prix de la Nonette is a Group 2 flat horse race in France open to three-year-old thoroughbred fillies. It is run at Deauville over a distance of 2,000 metres (about 1¼ miles), and it is scheduled to take place each year in August.

History
The event was established in 1952, and it was originally held at Longchamp. It was named after the Nonette, a tributary of the Oise in northern France.

The race was initially contested over 2,200 metres. It was run over 2,400 metres in 1959 and 1960, and shortened to 2,100 metres in 1961.

The Prix de la Nonette was transferred to Deauville and cut to 2,000 metres in 1980. It has continued at this venue with the exception of two periods, 1984–85 and 1989–91, when it took place at Longchamp.

The race was formerly classed at Group 3 level, and it was sponsored by Darley from 2005 to 2010. It was promoted to Group 2 status and backed by Shadwell in 2011.

The Prix de la Nonette sometimes serves as a trial for the following month's Prix Vermeille. The first horse to win both contests was Lezghinka in 1960, and the most recent was Pearly Shells in 2002.

Records
<div style="font-size:90%">
Leading jockey (6 wins):
 Freddy Head – Hecuba (1969), Pistol Packer (1971), Detroit (1980), Fitnah (1985), Grafin (1994), Matiara (1995)
 Gérald Mossé - Karmiska (1987), River Nymph	(1992), Shemaka	(1993), Zainta (1998), Dream Peace (2011), Rumi (2021)

Leading trainer (8 wins):
 André Fabre – Sierra Roberta (1989), Colour Chart (1990), Luna Wells (1996), Diamilina (2001), Grey Lilas (2004), Tashelka (2007), Romantica (2012), Tasaday (2013)Leading owner (3 wins):
 HH Aga Khan IV – Sharaya (1983), Shemaka (1993), Zainta (1998) Jean-Luc Lagardère – Karmiska (1987), Luna Wells (1996), Diamilina (2001) Sheikh Mohammed – Colour Chart (1990), Grafin (1994), Tashelka (2007)</div>

Winners since 1979

 Bint Salsabil and Bint Shadayid finished first and second in 1996, but the race was awarded to the third-placed horse.

Earlier winners

 1952: Harbour Grace
 1953: Gourabe
 1954: Chimere Fabuleuse
 1955: Anne
 1956: Yasmin
 1957: Denisy
 1958: Djelouba
 1959: Matchiche
 1960: Lezghinka
 1961: La Bergerette
 1962: Salinas
 1963: Royal Girl
 1964:
 1965: Tinganeve
 1966: Bubunia
 1967: Silver Cloud
 1968: Pola Bella
 1969: Hecuba
 1970: Popkins
 1971: Pistol Packer
 1972: Rescousse
 1973: Gay Style
 1974: Paulista
 1975: Ivanjica
 1976: Theia
 1977: Kamicia
 1978: Tempus Fugit

See also
 List of French flat horse races

References

 France Galop / Racing Post:

 france-galop.com – A Brief History: Prix de la Nonette. galop.courses-france.com – Prix de la Nonette – Palmarès depuis 1983. galopp-sieger.de – Prix de la Nonette. horseracingintfed.com – International Federation of Horseracing Authorities – Prix de la Nonette (2017). pedigreequery.com – Prix de la Nonette – Deauville.''

Flat horse races for three-year-old fillies
Deauville-La Touques Racecourse
Horse races in France
Recurring sporting events established in 1952